Araeosoma tessellatum is a species of sea urchin of the family Echinothuriidae. Their armour is covered with spines. It is placed in the genus Araeosoma and lives in the sea. Araeosoma tessellatum was first scientifically described in 1879 by Alexander Emanuel Agassiz.

See also 
 Araeosoma paucispinum
 Araeosoma splendens
 Araeosoma thetidis

References 

tessellatum
Animals described in 1879